The following is a list of notable events and releases that happened in 2016 in music in Australia.

Events

January

February

March
 14 May – Australia's representative in the Eurovision Song Contest 2016, Dami Im, finishes in second place with 511 points for her song "Sound of Silence". She was beaten only by contest winner, Ukrainian representative Jamala.

April

May

June

July
22–24 July – Splendour in the Grass 2016 is held at North Byron Parklands in Yelgun, New South Wales, headlined by The Strokes, The Cure and Flume.

August

September

October

November

December

Bands disbanded

Album and Single releases

Albums
27 May - Skin by Flume
19 August - Seven Mirrors by Drapht
10 December - The End of the Beginning by B-Nasty

Singles
16 January - Never Be like You by Flume
29 January - Smoke & Retribution by Flume
30 March - All Love by Drapht
22 April -  Say It by Flume
10 June - In My Blood by The Veronicas
24 June - Monster Truck - by Allday
8 July - Mexico by Drapht
15 July - Sides by Allday
11 August - Send Nudes by Allday
14 October - On Your Side by The Veronicas
15 December - Raceway by Allday

Deaths

8 March - Ross Hannaford, 65, guitarist, songwriter
9 March - Jon English, 66, singer, musician, songwriter
28 April - David Page, 55, musician
18 November - Hugh McDonald, 62, musician, singer, songwriter, guitarist
29 November - Allan Zavod, 71, musician
4 December - Wayne Duncan, 72, musician

See also
Australia in the Eurovision Song Contest 2016
List of number-one singles of 2016 (Australia)
List of number-one albums of 2016 (Australia)

References

 
Australian
Australian music